Adorable Liar is a 1962 French romantic comedy film directed by Michel Deville, starring Marina Vlady, Macha Méril and Jean-Marc Bory.

Cast
 Marina Vlady as Juliette
 Macha Méril as Sophie
 Michel Vitold as Antoine
 Jean-Marc Bory as Martin
 Claude Nicot as Sebastien
 Ginette Letondal as Jacky
 Jean-Pierre Moulin as Vincent
 François Dalou as Thomas
 Michael Lonsdale as Albert

References

Bibliography
 Dayna Oscherwitz & MaryEllen Higgins. The A to Z of French Cinema. Scarecrow Press, 2009.

External links
 

1962 films
1962 romantic comedy films
1960s French-language films
French romantic comedy films
French black-and-white films
Films directed by Michel Deville
1960s French films